Tricholoma batschii is a species of fungus belonging to the family Tricholomataceae.

It is found in Europe.

References

batschii
Fungi described in 1969
Fungi of Europe